Albert B. Douglas (September 2, 1912 – March 6, 1971) was the eldest of the five sons of Will and Clara Douglas. He was the first person born in Briercrest, Saskatchewan, Canada.  A Saskatchewan wheat farmer, he was a member of parliament elected during the 28th Canadian Parliament on June 25, 1969, representing the Assiniboia riding.

References

1912 births
Liberal Party of Canada MPs
Members of the House of Commons of Canada from Saskatchewan
1971 deaths